Hamilton Cuffe Jones (1884 – 16 January 1960) was a trade union official and member of the Queensland Legislative Council.

Early life
Jones was born at London, England, to Phillip Allen Jones his wife Theresa (née Culley). He came to Australia at a young age, attended Brisbane State School, then began work in the timber industry as a Sawyer.

Beginning his career with the trade union movement, Jones was Secretary of the Timber Workers' Union and a representative on the Wages Board at the Gas works office. he then later on served as vice-president of the Waterfront Workers' Federation.

In World Was One, Jones joined the Australian Imperial Force where, as a member of the 2nd Light Horse Regiment he fought at Gallipoli, having his right thumb blown off.

Political career
When the Labour Party starting forming governments in Queensland, it found much of its legislation being blocked by a hostile Council, where members had been appointed for life by successive conservative governments. After a failed referendum in May 1917, Premier Ryan tried a new tactic, and later that year advised the Governor, Sir Hamilton John Goold-Adams, to appoint thirteen new members whose allegiance lay with Labour to the Council.

Jones was one of the thirteen new members, and went on to serve for four and a half years until the Council was abolished in March, 1922.

Jones was the endorsed Labor candidate for Kurilpa in the 1926 election but was unable to defeat the long-time sitting member James Fry.

Personal life
Jones was twice married, firstly to Eleanor Sissie Beattie in 1917, and together had three sons. He then married Emma Henry in 1938 and together had a son and daughter.

Jones died in Brisbane on 16 January 1960. He was cremated at Mount Thompson Crematorium and his ashes were interred there.

References

Members of the Queensland Legislative Council
1884 births
1960 deaths
Australian Labor Party members of the Parliament of Queensland
British emigrants to Australia
20th-century Australian politicians